Transportation in Indianapolis consists of a complex network that includes a local public bus system, several private intercity bus providers, Amtrak passenger rail service, four freight rail lines, an Interstate Highway System, two airports, a heliport, bikeshare system,  of bike lanes, and  of trails and greenways. The city has also become known for its prevalence of electric scooters.

History
The prospects of river navigation coupled with a site near the center of the state were largely responsible for the location of Indianapolis. However, the White River proved too shallow for commercial shipping. After the steamboat Robert Hanna ran aground along the river in 1831, no steamboat successfully returned to Indianapolis. Flatboats continued to transport goods along a portion of the river until new dams impeded their ability to navigate its waters.

In 1821, the Indiana General Assembly authorized the construction of ten state roads to connect Indianapolis with other population centers throughout the state. By 1836, the National Road had reached Indianapolis. The National Road was the first major improved highway in the U.S. built by the federal government. Built between 1811 and 1837, the  road extended east to Cumberland, Maryland and west to Vandalia, Illinois. Michigan Road, which bisected the state from north to south, was completed in 1839. Michigan Road connected Indianapolis to the inland ports of Michigan City, Indiana and Madison, Indiana, opening the city to maritime transport via Lake Michigan and the Ohio River.

Two trains arrived in the city for the first time on October 1, 1847, to commemorate the completion of the Madison and Indianapolis Railroad. Within five years, seven rail lines converged in the city, including the Indianapolis and Bellefontaine Railroad, the Terre Haute and Richmond Railroad, the Peru and Indianapolis Railroad, the Indianapolis and Cincinnati Railroad, and the Indianapolis and Lafayette Railroad companies. Indianapolis is credited as the birthplace of the union station, conceiving of the concept in 1848. In 1849, the city's competing railroad companies cooperated to form the Indianapolis Union Railway Company to oversee operations of the first union depot, completed on September 20, 1853.

Public transit arrived in Indianapolis on October 3, 1864, in the form of 12-seat mule-drawn streetcars which began operating between Union Station and Military Park. Citizens Street Railway Company managed several streetcar lines running on a hub-and-spoke system radiating from downtown Indianapolis to outlying neighborhoods. The first electric streetcar began operation on June 18, 1890, replacing the last of the mule-drawn streetcars in 1894. Electrification of the city's streetcar system dramatically improved efficiency and expediency, allowing residents to live further from the civic and business center of downtown. The development of several streetcar suburbs occurred during this time, including Irvington, Riverside, and Woodruff Place.

As the city and its rail traffic increased, the original union depot quickly became obsolete necessitating the construction of a larger union station in 1886. At the time of its opening in 1888, Indianapolis Union Station was servicing 80 passenger trains per day from 16 different railroad companies. In 1893, approximately 25,000 passengers rode an average of 120 passenger trains daily. By 1900, 150 trains were arriving daily. As the city's population grew and rail traffic increased, congestion at numerous level crossings became a major concern. Between 1905 and 1920, the city coordinated with the railroads to elevate tracks.

On January 1, 1900, the first interurban arrived in Indianapolis from Greenwood, Indiana. To accommodate the growing popularity of interurban travel, the Indianapolis Traction Terminal opened in September 1904, serving all but one of the 13 interurban lines converging in the city. As the busiest interurban station in the world, the Indianapolis Traction Terminal was the hub for Indiana's extensive  interurban system. According to the Encyclopedia of Indianapolis, at the height of ridership, the terminal served more than 600 trains daily and seven million passengers annually. As automobiles became increasingly prevalent, the interurban's popularity waned. The Indianapolis Traction Terminal served its last interurban in September 1941.

Some of the first aircraft to take flight in the city occurred at the Indianapolis Motor Speedway during the first licensed aviation meet in the U.S. and first public demonstration of airplanes in Indiana, from June 13–18, 1910. Several aviators, including Orville and Wilbur Wright, participated in the event which drew thousands of spectators. As aviation technology improved, it wasn't until the 1920s that several airfields opened throughout Indianapolis. The city's first public landing strip opened in July 1920 under the auspices of the Indianapolis Aerial Association; however, the strip was short-lived. Successive airfields included Crawford Field (1922), Schoen Field (1922), Cox Field (later renamed Stout Field) (1926), Hoosier Airport (1927), and Capitol Airways Airport (1928). Cox Field was the city's first municipal airport, serving as the site of Indianapolis's first regularly scheduled commercial flight, on December 17, 1927. On March 28, 1944, the airport was renamed Weir Cook Municipal Airport, commemorating Harvey Weir Cook.

Like most American cities following World War II, Indianapolis's electric streetcar ridership declined as personal automobile ownership became increasingly attainable. In 1952, more than 400 public transit vehicles traveled more than 43,000 miles daily, carrying 72 million passengers annually. The city's last streetcar was decommissioned in January 1953, replaced by trackless trolleys and motor buses.

With the passage of the Federal Aid Highway Act of 1956, major construction of the Interstate Highway System began locally in 1959 on the Interstate 465 beltway. The beltway was completed on October 5, 1970. Segments of Interstates 65, 69, 70, and 74 in Indianapolis were largely completed by the mid-1970s. Interstate 165 is the only planned Interstate highway never built in the city. I-165 was originally planned as a  spur route between I-65 and 38th Street on the near northside of Indianapolis. The highway was withdrawn from the Interstate System on July 30, 1981.

In 1961, the Indiana General Assembly approved legislation allowing for the creation of a local administrative body to oversee air transportation throughout the region. In 1962, the Indianapolis Airport Authority was established as a municipal corporation of the City of Indianapolis to serve this role. Numerous expansions have occurred since Indianapolis International Airport opened in 1931, the most recent completed in 2008 at a cost of US$1.1 billion. The 1.2-million-square-foot (110,000 m2) midfield Colonel H. Weir Cook Terminal opened on November 11, 2008. Completion of the terminal was preceded by a new FAA Air Traffic Control Tower and Terminal Radar Approach Control building in April 2006.

Indianapolis was home to the first electric carsharing service in the U.S., Bolloré Bluecar's BlueIndy. Operations launched in September 2015 and ceased in May 2020. At the height of service, BlueIndy provided 200 electric cars and 92 charging stations throughout the city.

Intercity
Intercity transportation infrastructure in the Indianapolis metropolitan area consists of a complex network that includes an international airport, nine general aviation facilities, several private bus carriers, Amtrak passenger rail service, and four freight rail lines. The region's four primary and two auxiliary freeways are part of the Interstate Highway System.

Aviation

Indianapolis International Airport is the region's primary commercial airport. In 2021, the airport served 7.1 million passengers, handled 1.3 million metric tons of cargo, and saw nearly 186,000 aircraft operations. The Federal Aviation Administration (FAA) National Plan of Integrated Airport Systems for 2017–2021 categorized it as a medium hub primary commercial service facility. The airport is home to the Indianapolis Air Route Traffic Control Center (ZID), one of 22 established FAA air route traffic control centers in the U.S.

The airport is owned and operated by the Indianapolis Airport Authority, a municipal corporation. The airport completed a new air traffic control tower in 2006 and terminal in 2008. The Colonel H. Weir Cook Terminal contains two concourses and 40 gates, connecting to 51 nonstop domestic and international destinations and averaging 145 daily departures. The airport is a major international cargo hub, home to significant operations for FedEx Express. It ranks among the ten busiest airports in terms of cargo throughput in the U.S.

The Indianapolis Airport Authority owns and operates an additional five aviation facilities in the city and surrounding counties:
 Eagle Creek Airpark (Indianapolis)
 Hendricks County Airport (Danville)
 Indianapolis Downtown Heliport (Indianapolis)
 Indianapolis Metropolitan Airport (Fishers)
 Indianapolis Regional Airport (Greenfield)

Four other publicly owned general aviation airports are located elsewhere in the Indianapolis metropolitan area:
 Anderson Municipal Airport (Anderson)
 Indianapolis Executive Airport (Zionsville)
 Indy South Greenwood Airport (Greenwood)
 Shelbyville Municipal Airport (Shelbyville)

Bus
Intercity bus service to Indianapolis is provided by Barons Bus Lines, Burlington Trailways, FlixBus, Greyhound Lines, and Miller Transportation, among other private carriers. In 2021, Indianapolis Union Station was the state's primary intercity bus transfer hub, served by seven carriers operating 12 routes.

Rail

Amtrak provides inter-city rail service to Indianapolis via Union Station, serving nearly 25,000 passengers in 2019. The Cardinal makes three weekly trips between New York City and Chicago. The Hoosier State provided service between Indianapolis and Chicago on days the Cardinal did not operate. The line was discontinued in 2019 after the Indiana General Assembly withdrew its funding from the state's budget.

Amtrak's Beech Grove Shops, in the enclave of Beech Grove, serve as its primary heavy maintenance and overhaul facility, while the Indianapolis Distribution Center is the company's largest material and supply terminal.

Advocates and state officials have identified the Indianapolis–Chicago and Indianapolis–Louisville corridors as priorities for future passenger rail investments. Amtrak's 2021 Connects US plan identified proposed new routes and service frequencies, including eight daily round trips between Indianapolis and Chicago, and four each between Indianapolis, Louisville, and Cincinnati. The plan also proposes a new train station at Indianapolis International Airport.

Freight rail lines converging in the city include one Class I railroad (CSX Transportation), one Class II railroad (Indiana Rail Road Company), and two shortline railroads (Indiana Southern Railroad and Louisville and Indiana Railroad). Indianapolis is a hub for CSX Transportation, home to its division headquarters, an intermodal terminal, and classification yard in the suburb of Avon.

Highways

The Indiana Department of Transportation (INDOT) manages all Interstates, U.S. Highways, and Indiana State Roads within Indianapolis. Among urbanized areas with 1,000,000 population or greater in the U.S., Indianapolis ranked tenth in freeway lane miles per 1,000 population and eighth in freeway-equivalent miles per 1,000 population, according to 1999 data.

According to transportation analytics firm INRIX, Indianapolis motorists averaged 24 hours stuck in traffic in 2022. This marked a 71% increase from 2021 but was still lower than congestion experienced in 2019 (prior to the COVID-19 pandemic).

Interstates
The Indianapolis metropolitan area is served by four primary and two auxiliary freeways that are part of the Interstate Highway System. Interstate 465 (I-465) is a  beltway that encircles Indianapolis, linking all Interstates in the city.

Among primary Interstates serving Indianapolis, Interstate 65 (I-65) and Interstate 70 (I-70) are the only two that bisect the city north–south and east–west. I-65 and I-70 meet near downtown Indianapolis, informally referred to as the "inner loop". The North Split interchange—where the two highways merge northeast of the central business district—is the second-busiest interchange in Indiana, with traffic counts of more than 200,000 vehicles per day. INDOT began a $350 million reconstruction of the interchange in 2021. Northbound I-65 terminates at Interstate 90 (Indiana Toll Road) in Gary, Indiana, while southbound I-65 reaches Louisville, Kentucky. Westbound I-70 reaches St. Louis, Missouri, while eastbound I-70 reaches Columbus, Ohio.

Two additional primary Interstates serve Indianapolis: Interstate 69 (I-69) and Interstate 74 (I-74). I-69 reaches Fort Wayne, Indiana, to the north. As of December 2022, I-69 terminates at I-465 on the city's northeast side; however, construction is underway on the city's south side to complete the final  leg of the highway between Martinsville, Indiana, and Indianapolis. Once completed in 2024, I-69 will extend south from Indianapolis to Evansville, Indiana. From Peoria, Illinois, I-74 converges with I-465 on the city's west side, runs concurrent with I-465, then diverges on the city's southeast side toward Cincinnati, Ohio. Interstate 865 (I-865) serves as a  connector between I-65 and I-465, northwest of Indianapolis proper in Boone County.

U.S. Highways and state roads
Indianapolis is served by six U.S. Highways, five of which share a concurrency with I-465, and four Indiana State Roads. Starting in 1967, INDOT began rerouting U.S. Highways and Indiana State Roads to the I-465 beltway to bypass local traffic. On July 1, 1999, INDOT completed decommissioning the remaining highway segments inside the beltway.

US 31 reaches South Bend, Indiana, to the north and Jeffersonville, Indiana, to the south. US 36 reaches Springfield, Illinois, to the west and Piqua, Ohio, to the east. US 40, the Historic National Road, reaches Terre Haute, Indiana, to the west and Richmond, Indiana, to the east. Within Marion County, US 40 and its predecessor route through Indianapolis is named Washington St. US 52 reaches Lafayette, Indiana, to the northwest and Brookville, Indiana, to the southeast. US 136 reaches Danville, Illinois, to the west and terminates at I-465 on the city's west side near Speedway, Indiana. US 421 reaches Michigan City, Indiana, to the north and Madison, Indiana, to the south.

State Road 37 reaches Tell City, Indiana, to the south and Marion, Indiana, to the north. State Road 67 (Kentucky Ave.) reaches Vincennes, Indiana, to the southwest and Portland, Indiana, to the northeast. State Road 134 is a  segment of Girls School Rd. connecting the Indiana Women's Prison to US 136 on the city's west side. From its northern terminus at US 31 on the city's south side, State Road 135 (Meridian St. via Thompson Rd.) terminates near Mauckport, Indiana, at the Ohio River.

Intracity
Intracity transportation infrastructure in Indianapolis consists of a local public bus system, a bicycle-sharing system, and a network of bike lanes, trails, and greenways.

Bicycling

In recent years, officials have committed to increased funding for bicycling infrastructure upgrades and additions, including the city's first neighborways. Popular existing trails and greenways in the city include the Fall Creek Greenway, Indianapolis Cultural Trail, Pleasant Run Greenway, and Monon Trail. The latter is a rail trail and part of the United States Bicycle Route System (USBR 35).

Indiana Pacers Bikeshare debuted in 2014 as the city's public bicycle-sharing system, consisting of 525 bicycles and 50 docking stations. Stations are sited on or near the city's public trails and greenways.

Indianapolis is designated a "Bronze Level" Bicycle Friendly Community by the League of American Bicyclists.

Public transit
The Indianapolis Public Transportation Corporation, doing business as IndyGo, operates and manages the city's public bus system, including bus rapid transit, microtransit, and paratransit services. In 2020, IndyGo operated 31 fixed routes with a fleet of 212 buses, serving about 4.8 million passenger trips (compared with pre-COVID-19 pandemic ridership of 9.2 million in 2019).

The municipal corporation began operations in 1975 under the name Metro. The Julia M. Carson Transit Center opened in 2016 as the downtown transfer hub for 27 of its 31 bus routes.

In 2017, City-County Council approved a voter referendum increasing Marion County's income tax to help fund IndyGo's first major system expansion since its founding. Local taxes and federal grants will fund systemwide improvements, including the creation of three bus rapid transit lines, battery electric buses, sidewalks, bus shelters, extended hours and weekend schedules.

Established in 2007, the Central Indiana Regional Transportation Authority (CIRTA) is a quasi-governmental agency that organizes regional car and vanpools and operates three public workforce connectors from Indianapolis to employment centers in suburban Plainfield and Whitestown. CIRTA serves ten counties, including Boone, Delaware, Hamilton, Hancock, Hendricks, Johnson, Madison, Marion, Morgan, and Shelby.

Bus rapid transit

The first of IndyGo's three bus rapid transit projects, the Red Line, began service on September 1, 2019. The  Purple Line, the system's second bus rapid transit route, will connect downtown Indianapolis to Lawrence, Indiana. Construction began on February 25, 2022. Groundbreaking on the Blue Line is anticipated in 2024.

Streetcars and light rail
Historically, Indianapolis had an extensive streetcar network. In 1953, the last streetcars ran in the city, followed by the demise of trolleybuses four years later. Since 1957, the city's transit system has been exclusively served by bus.

Interest in reintroducing a streetcar system in the city began during the mayoral administration of Stephen Goldsmith in the 1990s. In 2008, civic leaders formed the Downtown Indianapolis Streetcar Corp., a nonprofit focused on studying the feasibility of a downtown streetcar circulator. After three years of study, the group proposed a  streetcar circulator linking key attractions on the west side of downtown Indianapolis at an estimated cost of $20 to $25 million.

In 2008, the Central Indiana Regional Transportation Authority (CIRTA) identified the former Nickel Plate corridor between downtown Indianapolis and the northern suburb of Noblesville as the initial leg of a proposed regional commuter rail network.

In 2010, the Central Indiana Transit Task Force released a $6.7 billion proposal with several recommendations for the region, including a north–south commuter rail line between Fishers and Greenwood and an east–west light rail line along Washington St. between Cumberland and the Indianapolis International Airport.

In 2014, the Indiana General Assembly granted Indianapolis and five neighboring counties the authority to raise local income taxes to fund public transit by referendum. As part of a legislative compromise, the bill included a provision prohibiting local governments from publicly financing light rail projects.

People mover

Launched in 2003, the Indiana University Health People Mover linked the Indiana University School of Medicine with the medical centers of Methodist Hospital, Riley Hospital for Children, University Hospital, and related facilities on the Indiana University–Purdue University Indianapolis (IUPUI) campus via three elevated stations. Indiana University Health suspended service on the  people mover in February 2019 due to maintenance costs, opting to replace the service with bus shuttles.

See also
Indiana Central Canal

References

External links

 Encyclopedia of Indianapolis – Transportation

 
Indianapolis, Indiana